Alagapuram is metro area in Hastampatti zone of Salem City Municipal Corporation. Alagapuram is a locality in Salem City in Tamil Nadu, India.

Nearby areas 
Arumugam Nagar, Bhuvaneswari Nagar, Thangavel Nagar, Thangavel Nagar, MDS Nagar are the nearby localities to Alagapuram.

References 

Neighbourhoods in Salem, Tamil Nadu